Gálvez is a city in the center of the province of Santa Fe, Argentina,  south of the provincial capital Santa Fe.

The original settlement was an agricultural colony called Colonia Margarita, in lands belonging to José Gálvez, then governor of the province, who rented it for farming, mainly to Italian immigrants from Piamonte and Lombardia. The official foundation date, 15 October 1886, is that of the opening of the train station, as is usual in many other towns founded in this period in Santa Fe. The communal institutions were formally created on 12 January 1887, and the town became a full municipality on 19 March 1939. The name of governor Gálvez replaced the original one by a decree of 6 June 1889.

The area of Gálvez has a good precipitation regime and produces diverse crops (wheat, corn, soybean, sorghum, sunflower). Cattle are mostly employed for its milk (the central region of Santa Fe is the most important milk-producing area in Argentina). Local industries include the manufacturing of electric engines and transformers, machine tools, furniture, and dairy products.

Notable people
 

Roberto Brunetto (born 1955), former Argentine football player

References
 
 
 Municipality of Gálvez — Official website.
 Ciudad de Gálvez — Portal of the city.

Populated places in Santa Fe Province